Eric Carl Nolte (born April 28, 1964) is a former Major League Baseball pitcher who played for four seasons. He was drafted by the Padres in the Sixth Round of the 1985 MLB Draft. He pitched for the San Diego Padres from 1987 to 1989 and 1991 and the Texas Rangers in 1991. Nolte recorded his first MLB win on August 1, 1987.

External links

1964 births
Living people
San Diego Padres players
Texas Rangers players
Major League Baseball pitchers
Baseball players from California
Albuquerque Dukes players
Calgary Cannons players
American expatriate baseball players in Canada
Charleston Rainbows players
Denver Zephyrs players
Las Vegas Stars (baseball) players
New Orleans Zephyrs players
Oklahoma City 89ers players
Reno Padres players
San Bernardino Spirit players
Spokane Indians players
Wichita Pilots players